Rabbi Akiva Eiger (also spelled Eger;), or Akiva Güns (17611837) was an outstanding Talmudic scholar, influential halakhic decisor and foremost leader of European Jewry during the early 19th century. He was also a mohel.

Life
Eiger was born in Pressburg - Bratislava, Royal Hungary (modern-day Slovakia). He was a child prodigy and was educated first at the Mattersburg yeshiva and later by his uncle, Rabbi Wolf Eiger, (1756–1795) (b. 5516, d. 6 Tishrei 5556), at the Breslau (Wrocław) yeshiva, who later became rabbi of Biała and Leipnik. Out of respect for his uncle he changed his surname to Eiger. He therefore shared the full name Akiva Eiger with his maternal grandfather, the first Rabbi Akiva Eiger (17221758) (b. 5482, d. 15 Elul 5518), the author of Mishnas De'Rebbi Akiva who was rabbi of Zülz, Silesia from 1749 and Pressburg from 1756.

He was the rabbi of Märkisch Friedland, West Prussia, from 1791 until 1815; then for the last twenty two years of his life, he was the rabbi of the city of Posen (Poznań). He was a rigorous casuist of the old school, and his chief works were legal notes and responsa on the Talmud and the Shulchan Aruch. He believed that religious education was enough, and thus opposed the party which favored secular schools. He was a determined foe of the Reform movement, which had begun to make itself felt in his time.

Progeny 
Among his children were his two sons, Avraham (1781–1853) and Solomon (1785–1852), a rabbi in Kalisz, Poland and chief rabbi of Posen from 1837 to 1852. His daughter Sorel (Sarah) Eiger Sofer (1790–1832) (b. 5550, d. 18 Adar II 5592), was the second wife of the Chasam Sofer (1762–1839) rabbi of Pressburg.

Works 

 Gilyon HaShas, his notes on the margin of the Talmud (not intended originally for publication)
 Tosafot Rabbi Akiva Eiger, his supercommentary on the Mishnah's commentators, Bartenura and Tosafot Yom Tov
 Shu"t Rabbi Akiva Eiger, a collection of responsa
 Hagahot Rabbi Akiva Eiger, a supercommentary to the Shulchan Aruch's commentators, Magen Avraham and Turei Zahav
Drush veChidush

His commentaries on the Talmud have also been published as Chidushei (novellae of) Rabbi Akiva Eiger on Shas

References 

Attribution:
 
 Jacob H. Sinason. Gaon of Posen: A Portrait of Rabbi Akiva Guens-Eiger. Feldheim, 1990. .

External links 
 Short biography of Rabbi Akiva Eiger
 Family tree
 Portrait of Rabbi Akiva Eiger

1761 births
1837 deaths
People from Eisenstadt
19th-century German rabbis
Hungarian Orthodox rabbis
Polish Haredi rabbis
German people of Hungarian-Jewish descent
Polish people of Hungarian descent
People from the Grand Duchy of Posen
Articles which contain graphical timelines
People from Mirosławiec
Mohels
Oberlander Jews
Rabbis
Authors of books on Jewish law